Mathieu Bragard (10 March 1895 – 19 July 1952) was a Belgian football player who competed in the 1920 Summer Olympics. He was a member of the Belgium team, which won the gold medal in the football tournament.

References

External links
profile

1895 births
1952 deaths
Belgian footballers
Footballers at the 1920 Summer Olympics
Olympic footballers of Belgium
Olympic gold medalists for Belgium
Belgium international footballers
Olympic medalists in football
Medalists at the 1920 Summer Olympics
Association football midfielders
20th-century Belgian people